Alexander Balos Williams (October 24, 1906 – March 25, 1991) was an American jazz trombonist, perhaps best known for playing with the premier big bands of his day, especially the Chick Webb orchestra. Williams also recorded extensively with Ella Fitzgerald.

Early life
The son of a preacher, Williams was born in Summerville, South Carolina. The family of thirteen moved to Washington D.C. when Williams was very young however, the siblings lost their parents six months apart and were sent to an St. Joseph's Industrial School, an orphanage in Delaware. There he joined the school band, but was put on tuba rather than trombone despite his requests. He began taking private lessons while attending Armstrong High School and occasionally played with his professor's sons. Williams played with several bands before he started playing with the Lincoln Theater pit band.

Career
His admiration of Fletcher Henderson strongly influenced Williams jazz musicianship which received notice locally. He played with Claude Hopkins in Atlantic City and later in 1929, joined Horace Henderson. He became the solo trombonist with Fletcher Henderson himself  but was fired after setting off a firecracker on stage. Williams became a staple player in the Chick Webb band from 1933-1940 where he later worked with a young Ella Fitzgerald. Her performance of "A-Tisket A-Tasket" made her a star and the band her accompaniment. He then worked with other bands including Cootie Williams (1942–43) with whom he recorded with Ella again. His associations in music included Sidney Bechet, Duke Ellington, Art Hodes and Roy Eldridge who he toured Europe with in 1947.

Personal life and death
By 1943, Williams was suffering from alcoholism, and despite his attempts to become sober, he continued to drink with many of his band leaders until he suffered from a severe breakdown with his health in 1950 causing him to retire from music. Although he tried to return to music, his dental health affected his embouchure causing him to quit music entirely. He died on March 25, 1991 in New York City. He is interred at Woodlawn Cemetery in the Bronx, New York City.

Select discography

With Ella Fitzgerald
Something To Live For (Verve)
Swingstation w/ Chick Webb (GRP)

With Rex Stewart
Ellingtonia (Dial)
Rex Stewart And His Orchestra (Plaza)
I'm The Luckiest Fool (Blue Star)

With Sidney Bechet
Sidney Bechet and His New Orleans Feetwarmers (Bluebird)

With Various Artists
Giants Of Small-Band Swing, Vols. 1 & 2 (Riverside)
The Complete H.R.S. Sessions (Mosaic)

Bibliography 
 "Boy Meets Horn", Rex Stewart,  - Includes a description of the European tour.

Sources
NME Artists

References

External links
 Sandy Williams recordings at the Discography of American Historical Recordings.

Related Pages 
 Sidney Bechet
 Roy Eldridge
 Duke Ellington
 Fletcher Henderson
 Horace Henderson
 Art Hodes
 Claude Hopkins
 Rex Stewart
 Vernon Story
 Ella Fitzgerald
 Chick Webb

American jazz trombonists
Male trombonists
Swing trombonists
1906 births
1991 deaths
People from Summerville, South Carolina
Musicians from South Carolina
20th-century American musicians
20th-century trombonists
20th-century American male musicians
American male jazz musicians